Emily Evans Tassey  (born Rowland, 1823 - 1899) was a 19th century inventor. Tassey earned patents for five inventions, all related to marine technology from 1860-1876.

They include improved apparatus for raising sunken vessels, improvements in siphon propeller pumps, and a dredging machine. Tassey was one of a small group of women during the nineteenth century that specialized in machine inventions.

Biography 
Emily Evans Rowland was born on December 15, 1823 in McKeesport, Pennsylvania. She was educated as a teacher at Steubenville Seminary and taught in the McKeesport School prior to being married. She married William D. Tassey a lawyer, in 1845 and they had three children. Her husband died in 1857 and Tassey continued teaching in the public schools in Pittsburgh and McKeesport. It is possible she turned to invention as a means to support herself and her children.

Tassey exhibited two of her inventions, both siphon propeller-pump inventions of 1876 and 1880 at the World's Columbian Exposition in Chicago in 1893.

Tassey died on November 27, 1899. She is buried in The McKeesport and Versailles Cemetery in McKeesport, Pennsylvania.

Patents 
 Improvement in apparatus for raising sunken vessels, 1876
 Improvement in siphon propeller-pumps, 1876
 Improvement in propulsion of vessels, 1876
 Improvement in dredging machines, 1876
 Siphon propeller-pump, 1880

Collections 
 Improvement in Propulsion of Vessels, December 5, 1876, Patent number: 184,997, Hagely Museum and Library, Wilmington, Delaware.
 Siphon Propeller-Pump, August 3, 1880, Patent number: 230,723, Hagely Museum and Library, Wilmington, Delaware.

References 

Women inventors
American patent holders

American inventors

1823 births

1899 deaths